Cut Your Heart Off From Your Head is the second album from Dublin-based instrumental band The Redneck Manifesto. It was recorded, mixed and produced by Alan O Boyle in February 2002. The album was mastered by Fergal Davis. Both men were involved in the production of the band's debut Thirtysixstrings.

Track listing

References

The Redneck Manifesto (band) albums
2002 albums